The Plover-class gunvessels were a class of wooden gunboats built for the Royal Navy in the late 1860s. They mostly served overseas and were retired early as they were regarded as hopelessly obsolete by the late 1880s.

Ships

Footnotes

Bibliography

 

 

 
Gunboat classes